Gerald A. Azzinaro Jr. (born July 11, 1958) is an American football coach who most recently served as the defensive coordinator for the UCLA Bruins football team. He played college football as a linebacker at American International College (AIC) and became a graduate assistant for the team in 1982. He was the linebackers and running backs coach for Westfield State in 1985, and he was the head coach for Western New England University in 1986. He was the defensive coordinator for AIC from 1987 to 1991, before becoming the linebackers coach and recruiting coordinator for Massachusetts in 1992. Azzinaro was promoted to defensive coordinator for the Minutemen in 1994, and subsequently moved on to Boston College as the team's defensive line coach in 1995. He was rehired by UMass in 1997 to be their defensive coordinator.

After coaching the defensive line at Maine in 1998, Azzinaro was the defensive line coach and recruiting coordinator for Syracuse from 1999 to 2003. He was the defensive coordinator for Duke from 2004 to 2006. He was the defensive line coach for New Hampshire in 2007 and for Marshall in 2008. He coached the Oregon Ducks' defensive line for four years from 2009 to 2012 before Chip Kelly brought him to coach alongside him while Chip coached the Eagles in 2013. However, in 2016, Azzinaro again followed Chip Kelly, this time to the San Francisco 49ers where Kelly was named head coach, and hired Azzinaro in same role he had in Philadelphia.

Head coaching record

References

External links
 UCLA profile

1958 births
Living people
American International Yellow Jackets football coaches
American International Yellow Jackets football players
Boston College Eagles football coaches
California Golden Bears football coaches
Duke Blue Devils football coaches
Maine Black Bears football coaches
Marshall Thundering Herd football coaches
New Hampshire Wildcats football coaches
Oregon Ducks football coaches
Philadelphia Eagles coaches
San Francisco 49ers coaches
Syracuse Orange football coaches
UCLA Bruins football coaches
UMass Minutemen football coaches
Western New England Golden Bears football coaches
Westfield State Owls football coaches
Sportspeople from Brooklyn
Players of American football from New York City
Coaches of American football from New York (state)